Mark Harvey Crow (born October 22, 1954) is a retired American professional basketball player who spent one season in the National Basketball Association (NBA) with the New Jersey Nets during the 1977–78 season. He was drafted by the Nets from Duke University in the sixth round (111 overall) during the 1977 NBA Draft.

Mark played in Europe from 1978. Playing in Italy, Portugal and Spain. He finished his career in Udine, Italy in 1988. Mark speaks fluent Italian, as well as Spanish and Portuguese.

Following his career, he began player management, working with NBA and international player agent Herb Rudoy.

References

External links

Italian League profile

1954 births
Living people
American expatriate basketball people in Italy
American expatriate basketball people in Portugal
American expatriate basketball people in Spain
Basket Rimini Crabs players
Basketball players from California
Real Betis Baloncesto players
Duke Blue Devils men's basketball players
Fabriano Basket players
New Jersey Nets draft picks
New Jersey Nets players
Small forwards
Victoria Libertas Pallacanestro players
American men's basketball players